was a Japanese film and theatre actress who already had long stage experience, first with light comedies, later with dramatic roles, before making her film debut. Mochizuki often appeared in the films of Keisuke Kinoshita, but also worked for prominent directors such as Yasujirō Ozu and Mikio Naruse. She won the Blue Ribbon Award for best supporting actress for Late Chrysanthemums and for best actress for The Rice People and Unagitori.  She was also awarded best actress at the 1953 Mainichi Film Awards for her performance in A Japanese Tragedy. In 1960, she directed the children's short film 海を渡る友情 (Umiwowataru yūjō, lit. "Friendship across the sea") for the Toei Educational Film Department.

In 1971, Mochizuki ran for the House of Councilors election for the Japan Socialist Party. She died of breast cancer in 1977.

Selected filmography
 Carmen Comes Home (1951) – director Keisuke Kinoshita
 Honjitsu kyūshin (1952) – director Minoru Shibuya
 Gendai-jin (1952) – director Minoru Shibuya
 The Flavor of Green Tea over Rice (1952) – director Yasujirō Ozu
 Carmen's Pure Love (1952) – director Keisuke Kinoshita
 A Japanese Tragedy (1953) – director Keisuke Kinoshita
 The Garden of Women (1954) – director Keisuke Kinoshita
 Late Chrysanthemums (1954) – director Mikio Naruse
 Growing Up (1955) – director Heinosuke Gosho
 The Tale of Jiro (1955) – director Hiroshi Shimizu
 Farewell to Dream (1956) – director Keisuke Kinoshita
 The Thick-Walled Room (1956) – director Masaki Kobayashi
 The Rice People (1957) – director Tadashi Imai
 Unagitori (1957) – director Sotoji Kimura
 Sorrow Is Only for Women (1958) – director Kaneto Shindō
 The Ballad of Narayama (1958) – director Keisuke Kinoshita
 Ballad of the Cart (1959) – director Satsuo Yamamoto
 A Town of Love and Hope (1959) – director Nagisa Ōshima
 The End of Summer (1961) – director Yasujirō Ozu
 Kwaidan (1964) – director Masaki Kobayashi

References

External links

Bibliography
 
 

1917 births
1977 deaths
Japanese film actresses
20th-century Japanese actresses
Actresses from Kanagawa Prefecture
Japanese actor-politicians